Donnan–Asher Iron-front Building is a historic commercial building located in Richmond, Virginia.  It was built in 1866, and is a four-story, 12 bay, Italianate style brick building with a cast iron front.

It was listed on the National Register of Historic Places in 1970.

References

External links
Donnan–Asher Iron-front Building, 1207–1211 East Main Street, Richmond, Independent City, Virginia: 6 photos and 8 data pages at Historic American Buildings Survey

Historic American Buildings Survey in Virginia
Commercial buildings on the National Register of Historic Places in Virginia
Italianate architecture in Virginia
Cast-iron architecture in Virginia
Commercial buildings completed in 1866
Buildings and structures in Richmond, Virginia
National Register of Historic Places in Richmond, Virginia
1866 establishments in Virginia